The discography of Czech-American musician Jan Hammer consists of 25 albums with Hammer as the lead artist, as well as several singles and a large number of collaborations with jazz and rock musicians, such as John McLaughlin, Jeff Beck, Al Di Meola, Mick Jagger, Carlos Santana, Stanley Clarke, Tommy Bolin, Neal Schon, Steve Lukather, and Elvin Jones among many others. He has composed and produced at least 14 original motion picture soundtracks, the music for 90 episodes of Miami Vice and 20 episodes of the popular British television series Chancer.

As leader

Charting singles

As sideman
With the Mahavishnu Orchestra (Columbia):
 The Inner Mounting Flame (1971)
 Birds of Fire (1973)
 Between Nothingness and Eternity (1973)
 The Best of The Mahavishnu Orchestra (1980)
 The Lost Trident Sessions (recorded 1973, released 1999)
 Unreleased Tracks from Between Nothingness & Eternity (recorded 1973, released 2011 in box set)

With Jeff Beck (Epic):
 Wired (1976)
 Jeff Beck With the Jan Hammer Group Live (1977)
 There & Back (1980)
 Flash (1985)
 Beckology (1991)
 The Best of Beck (1995)
 Who Else! (1999)

With Al Di Meola (Columbia):
 Elegant Gypsy (1977)
 Splendido Hotel (1980)
 Electric Rendezvous (1982)
 Tour De Force – Live (1982)
 Scenario (1984)
 The Electric Anthology (1995)
 This Is Jazz Volume 31 (1997)
 Anthology (2000)

With Frank Foster
The Loud Minority (Mainstream, 1972)

With Carlos Santana (Columbia):
 Love Devotion Surrender (1973) –  Hammond organ, drums, percussion

With Billy Cobham (Atlantic):
 Spectrum (1973) – keyboards

With Stanley Clarke (Nemperor):
 Stanley Clarke (1974) – keyboards

With Harvey Mason (Arista):
 Earth Mover (1975) – keyboards (Mini Moog)

With Lenny White (Nemperor):
 Big City (1977) – keyboards

With John Abercrombie (ECM):
 Timeless (recorded 1974, released 1975) – organ, synth, piano
 Night (1984) – keyboards

With The Freelance Hellraiser (Sony/BMG):
 Waiting for Clearance (2006) – keyboards

With Tommy Bolin (Atlantic):
 Teaser (1975) – keyboards, drums
 From the Archives Vol. 1 (1996) – keyboards

With Elvin Jones
 Merry-Go-Round (Blue Note, 1971) – piano
 Mr. Jones (Blue Note, 1972) – piano
 The Prime Element (Blue Note, 1973) – keyboards
Elvin Jones is "On the Mountain" (PM, 1975) – keyboards
With Jeremy Steig
Energy (Capitol, 1971)
Fusion (Groove Merchant, 1972)
With Glen Moore (Elektra):
 Introducing Glen Moore (1978) – drums (with Glen Moore - double bass & piano, David Darling - cello, Zbigniew Seifert - violin)

With Steve Grossman (PM Records):
 Some Shapes to Come (1974) – Electric piano and moog synthesizer
 Terra Firma (1977) - Electric piano and moog synthesizer

With Joni Mitchell (Asylum):
 Mingus (1979) – Mini Moog

With Tony Williams (Columbia):
 The Joy of Flying (1979) – keyboards

With Mick Jagger (Columbia):
 She's the Boss (1985) – keyboards

With James Young (Passport):
 City Slicker (1985) – keyboards, drums

With Clarence Clemons (Columbia):
 An Evening With Mr. C (1989) – keyboards, drums

With Steve Lukather (Columbia):
 Lukather (1989) – keyboards

With Charlie Mariano (MPS):
 Helen 12 Trees (1976) – keyboards (with Charlie Mariano - saxes & nagaswaram, Zbigniew Seifert - violin, John Marshall - drums, Jack Bruce - bass)

With Yoshiaki Masuo (Electric Bird/King):
 Finger Dancing / Yoshiaki Masuo with Jan Hammer (Recorded 1980) – Oberheim, Mini Moog, YAMAHA CP70

References

 

Hammer, Jan
Hammer, Jan